Paul Theodore Blessing (January 6, 1919 – May 6, 1990) was an American football player. 

Blessing was born in Tilden, Nebraska, in 1919. He attended Ord High School in Ord, Nebraska. He helped lead the Ord football team to more than 40 consecutive victories. He played college football for Nebraska-Kearney. He competed in multiple sports at Kearney, winning 11 varsity letters. He graduated from Kearney in May 1942. 

After graduating from Kearney in 1942, Blessing rejected offers to play for multiple professional teams, including the Brooklyn Dodgers and New York Giants. He volunteered for military service, but he was rejected due to a punctured ear drum. He worked for a time in an ordnance plant operated by the Guthrie-Tipton Company.  He also worked as a football coach in Kewanee, Illinois, and Lexington, Nebraska.

In August 1944, he signed to play professional football in the National Football League (NFL) for the Detroit Lions. He appeared in eight NFL games as an end during the 1944 season.

He was married in December 1942 to Juanita Jillson. In 1945, he became head football coach at Ogallala High School. He died in 1990 in Englewood, Colorado.

References

1919 births
1990 deaths
American football ends
Nebraska–Kearney Lopers football players
Detroit Lions players
Players of American football from Nebraska
People from Tilden, Nebraska